There are several conjectures known as the Hadwiger conjecture or Hadwiger's conjecture. They include:

 Hadwiger conjecture (graph theory), a relationship between the number of colors needed by a given graph and the size of its largest clique minor
 Hadwiger conjecture (combinatorial geometry) that for any n-dimensional convex body, at most 2n smaller homothetic bodies are necessary to contain the original
 Hadwiger's conjecture on dissection into orthoschemes

See also
 Hadwiger–Nelson problem on the chromatic number of unit distance graphs in the Euclidean plane
 Hadwiger's theorem characterizing measure functions in Euclidean spaces